Metsakalmistu (meaning Forest Cemetery) is a cemetery in the Pirita district of Tallinn.

Metsakalmistu was originally planned to be a public medieval cemetery. Eduard Vilde was the first to be buried in 1933. The original area of the cemetery was 24.2 hectares, but has since expanded to be 48.3 hectares.

Metsakalmistu was officially opened in 1939. That same year, 15 people were buried in the cemetery. In 1939, the nearby Kloostrimetsa Farm cemetery was created, which eventually, through expansion, became part of an expanded Metsakalmistu.

At first, the designers of the cemetery were unanimous about the general design requirements of the cemetery, but the area was still dominated by the appearance of a wild forest. Initially, there was placement of crosses, girders, ranks, and calcareous stones, the largest size of which were 80x50 cm. Subsequently, the use of natural barriers, such as grass slabs, were built and have been extended to include a moss bed cover, along with borders marked by flowers. Monumental gravestones were not recommended initially for the cemetery, but they still exist to a small extent. At present, the permissible maximum height for a pillar is 1.5 m.

The main chapel of Metsakalmistu was built in 1936, with its main architect being Herbert Johanson. The chapel was vandalized by the Soviet Union after the establishment of the Estonian SSR, but in 1996 it was restored with the support of the Tallinn City Government. In 2006, a columbarium was built.

Tombstones in Metsakalmistu are reserved for notable Estonian people involved in, among other professions, theatre, sports, composing, writing, the arts, journalism, medicine, architecture, and science, as well as other public figures; those who were soldiers in the Finnish Infantry Regiment 200, as well as the veterans of the Estonian War of Independence, are also buried here.

Notable people interred in the cemetery 

 Evald Aav
 Urmas Alender (cenotaph)
 August Alle
 Ants Antson
 Lydia Auster
 Eduard Bornhöhe
 Heino Eller
 August Englas
 Gustav Ernesaks
 Ants Eskola
 Illar Hallaste
 Helle-Reet Helenurm
 August Jakobson
 Jaak Joala
 Jüri Järvet
 Ottniell Jürissaar
 Karl Kalkun
 Eugen Kapp
 Nikolai Karotamm
 Kärt Jänes-Kapp
 Paul Keres
 Kaljo Kiisk
 Tõnu Kilgas
 Virve Kiple
 Albert Kivikas
 Paul Kogerman
 Lydia Koidula
 Konstantin Konik
 Johannes Kotkas
 Raimund Kull
 Ilmar Kullam
 Henn-Ants Kurg
 Betty Kuuskemaa
 Johannes Käbin
 Heli Lääts
 Ants Lauter
 Artur Lemba
 Astrid Lepa
 Kalju Lepik
 Robert Lepikson 
 Voldemar Lender
 Heino Lipp
 Endel Lippmaa
 Viljar Loor
 Sulev Luik
 Ada Lundver
 Meta Luts
 Heino Mandri
 Alo Mattiisen
 Roman Matsov
 Lennart Meri
 Mati Nuude
 Sulev Nõmmik
 Bruno Oja
 Karl Oole
 Georg Ots
 Rein Otsason
 Ülo Õun
 Kristjan Palusalu
 Boris Parsadanian
 Konstantin Päts
 Paul Pinna
 Voldemar Puhk
 Helmi Puur
 Edgar Puusepp
 Endel Puusepp
 Egon Rannet
 Alfons Rebane
 Salme Reek
 August Rei
 Johannes Semper
 Juhan Smuul
 Sophie Sooäär
 Ülo Sooster
 Olev Subbi
 Lepo Sumera
 Aino Talvi
 Väino Tamm
 A. H. Tammsaare
 Ruut Tarmo
 Otto Tief
 Villu Toots
 Friedebert Tuglas
 Mati Unt
 Artur Vader
 Katrin Välbe
 Raimond Valgre
 Edgar Valter
 Johannes Vares-Barbarus
 Asta Vihandi
 Juhan Viiding
 Edgar Viies
 Aarne Viisimaa
 Vello Viisimaa
 Eduard Vilde
 Silvi Vrait

See also
 List of cemeteries in Estonia

References

External links
 
 Maetute otsing

Cemeteries in Tallinn
1939 establishments in Estonia